Kadyos, manok, kag ubad, commonly shortened to KMU, is a Filipino chicken soup or stew originating from the Hiligaynon people of the Western Visayas islands. The name of the dish means "pigeon peas, chicken, and banana pith"; the three main ingredients. It is similar to another Hiligayon dish, Kadyos, baboy, kag langka ("KBL"), except that it does not use a souring agent, and it uses chicken and banana pith (ubad, not to be confused with ubod which is heart of palm) instead. Like KBL, KMU is also characteristically purple in color due to the use of pigeon peas. Other ingredients include onions, lemongrass, thinly-sliced ginger, siling haba pepper, and salt and pepper.

See also
 Cansi
 Filipino cuisine
 List of soups
 List of stews

References

Philippine soups
Philippine stews
Philippine chicken dishes
Visayan cuisine